Tore Ola Vorren (17 April 1944 – 16 June 2013) was a Norwegian geologist.

He took the cand.real. degree in 1970 at the University of Bergen. He was appointed as a lecturer at the University of Tromsø in 1973, took the dr.philos. degree here in 1978 and was promoted to a professor in 1979. He served as both dean and prorector there, and chairman of the University Centre in Svalbard. He was a fellow of the Norwegian Academy of Science and Letters from 1993.

References

1944 births
2013 deaths
University of Bergen alumni
Academic staff of the University of Tromsø
Academic staff of the University Centre in Svalbard
20th-century Norwegian geologists
21st-century Norwegian geologists
Members of the Norwegian Academy of Science and Letters